Jack Babashoff, Jr. (born July 13, 1955) is an American former competition swimmer who won a silver medal in 100-meter freestyle at the 1976 Summer Olympics in Montreal, Quebec.  Two years later, he won a gold medal in the 4×100-meter freestyle relay at the 1978 World Aquatics Championships.  Jack attended Fountain Valley High School in Fountain Valley, California and the University of Alabama.

Jack is the son of Vera (Slevkoff) and Jack Babashoff, Sr.  Both of his parents are second-generation Russian-Americans.  His younger sisters Shirley and Debbie and brother Bill were also swimmers who competed at the international level.

See also
 List of Olympic medalists in swimming (men)
 List of World Aquatics Championships medalists in swimming (men)
 World record progression 4 × 100 metres freestyle relay
 World record progression 4 × 100 metres medley relay

References

1955 births
Living people
Alabama Crimson Tide men's swimmers
American male freestyle swimmers
American people of Russian descent
World record setters in swimming
Olympic silver medalists for the United States in swimming
Sportspeople from Whittier, California
Swimmers at the 1975 Pan American Games
Swimmers at the 1976 Summer Olympics
Swimmers at the 1979 Pan American Games
World Aquatics Championships medalists in swimming
Medalists at the 1976 Summer Olympics
Pan American Games gold medalists for the United States
Pan American Games silver medalists for the United States
Pan American Games medalists in swimming
Jewish American sportspeople
Jewish swimmers
Medalists at the 1975 Pan American Games
Medalists at the 1979 Pan American Games
21st-century American Jews